The British National Madison Championships were held annually as part of the British National Track Championships organised by British Cycling, originally with two separate championship events for amateur and professional riders previously.

The senior championships are now held as a stand-alone event, most recently in December 2016.

From 2016, the senior championships have been run under the new UCI rules; where laps gained or lost on the field count towards points, and the winner is the pair of riders with the most points overall.

Results

Men Senior

Women's Senior

Men's Junior

Event not held in 2014

Women's Junior

Male Under 16

Female Under 16

References

Results 1999
Results 2000
Results 2001
Results 2002
Madison results 2002–2005
Madison 2006
U16 Results 2014

Cycle racing in the United Kingdom
National track cycling championships
National championships in the United Kingdom
Annual sporting events in the United Kingdom